The Reebok Human Rights Award honoured activists under the age of thirty who fought for human rights through non-violent means. Each year, the award was given to four or five individuals. Each received a grant of US $50,000 that was to be used to support their human rights work. The awards were underwritten by the Reebok Foundation. 

Roots can be traced to 1988 when Amnesty International invited Reebok to sponsor Human Rights Now!, a series of worldwide music concerts. Youth from close to 40 countries received the award since it was established in 1988. No new awards have been given out since 2007.

Laureates

2007
 Laura McCargar, United States
 Anderson Sa, Brazil
 Iryna Toustsik, Belarus
 Ou Virak, Cambodia

2006 
 Li Dan, China
 Rachel Lloyd, United States
 Khurram Parvez, India
 Otto Saki, Zimbabwe

2005
 Zarema Mukusheva, Chechnya/Russia
 Carlos Rojas, Mexico
 Aloysius Toe, Liberia
 Charm Tong, Burma/Thailand

2004
 Yinka Jegede-Ekpe, Nigeria
 Vanita Gupta, United States
 Joênia Batista de Carvalho, Brazil
 Ahmad Nader Nadery, Afghanistan

2003
 Pedro Anaya, United States
 Anusuya (Oona) Chatterjee, United States
 Mohamed Pa-Momo Fofanah, Sierra Leone
 Ernest Guevara, Philippines
 Christian Mukosa, Democratic Republic of Congo

2002
 Kavwumbu Hakachima, Zambia
 Maili Lama]], Nepal
 Malika Asha Sanders, United States

2001
 Ndungi Githuku, Kenya
 Heather Barr, United States
 Kodjo Djissenou, Togo
 Will Coley, United States

1999
 Juliana Dogbadzi, Ghana
 Tanya Greene, United States
 Suba Meshack, Kenya
 Ka Hsaw Wa, Burma

1998
 Abraham Grebreyesus, Eritrea
 Rana Husseini, Jordan
 Van Jones, United States
 Dydier Kamundu, Democratic Republic of Congo

1996
 Innocent Chukwuma, Nigeria
 Jesús Tecú Osorio, Guatemala
 Julie Su, United States
 Ma Thida, Burma
 Craig Kielburger, Canada

1995
 Angela Elizabeth Brown, United States
 Miguel Angel de los Santos Cruz, Mexico
 Richard Nsanzabaganwa, Rwanda
 Ven. Phuntsog Nyidron, Tibet
 Broad Meadows Middle School, United States

1994
 Adauto Alves, Brazil
 Rose-Anne Auguste, Haiti
 Dilli Bahadur Chaudhary (Backward Society Education), Nepal
 Iqbal Masih, Pakistan
 Samuel Kofi Woods, Liberia

1993
 Marie-France Botte, Belgium
 Sia Runikui Kashinawa, Brazil
 Hisham Mubarak, Egypt
 Reverend Carl Washington, United States

1992
 Floribert Chebeya Bahizire, Zaire
 Fernando de Araujo, East Timor
 Stacy Kabat, United States
 Martin O'Brien, Northern Ireland

1991
 Mirtala Lopez, El Salvador
 Sauveur Pierre, United States
 Abubacar Sultan, Mozambique
 Carlos Toledo, Guatemala
 Ashley Black, United States

1990
 Jeffrey Bradley and Martin Dunn, United States
 Shawan Jabarin, West Bank
 Tracye Matthews, United States
 Akram Mayi, Iraq
 David Moya, Cuba

1989
 Louise Benally-Crittenden, United States
 Michael Brown and Alan Khazei, United States
 Li Lu, Wang Dan, Chai Ling and Wu'erkaixi, China
 Mercedes Doretti and Luis Fondebrider, Argentina
 Dawat Lupung, Malaysia
 Bryan Stevenson, United States

1988
 David Bruce, South Africa
 Joaquin Antonio Caceres, El Salvador
 Janet Cherry, South Africa
 Arn Chorn-Pond, United States
 Tanya Coke, United States
 Lobsang Jinpa, Tibet
 Salim Abdool Karim, South Africa
 Winona LaDuke, United States
 Juan Pablo Letelier, Chile
 Maria Paz Rodriguez, United States
 Dalee Sambo, United States

References

External links
  (archived, 17 Feb 2007)

Human rights awards
Reebok